Sir James Carroll  (Māori: Timi Kara; 20 August 1857 – 18 October 1926), was a New Zealand politician of Irish and Ngāti Kahungunu descent. Beginning his career as an interpreter and land agent, Carroll was elected to the Eastern Maori seat in 1887. He was acting colonial secretary (equivalent to the minister of internal affairs) from 1897 to 1899. He was the first Māori to hold the cabinet position of Minister of Native Affairs, which he held between 1899 and 1912. He was held in high regard within the Liberal Party and was acting prime minister in 1909 and 1911.

Early life
James Carroll was born at Wairoa, one of eight children of Joseph Carroll, born in Sydney of Irish descent, and Tapuke, a Māori woman of the Ngāti Kahungunu iwi. He was educated both at whare wananga (traditional Māori college) and the Wairoa native school but left early to be a farm worker. In 1870, while no more than thirteen, he was part of the Māori force pursuing Te Kooti in the Urewera, and his bravery was mentioned in dispatches. He became a cadet for the Native Department in Hawke's Bay and later in Wellington but was back on a farm by 1875. In 1881 he married Heni Materoa and they settled in Gisborne. The couple adopted several children but had none of their own.

Political career

Carroll first stood for Parliament in 1884, unsuccessfully contesting the Eastern Maori electorate against Wi Pere. By the 1887 election, John Ballance's  paternalistic Native Land Administration Act of 1886, which proposed leasing Māori lands through a government commissioner, was a major issue. Carroll, an opponent of the act, won the electorate. From , he represented the  electorate, until he was defeated in 1919.

Entering Parliament, Carroll wanted to create equality for Māori by allowing them to lease land and use the revenue to invest in their own farms. The settler preference was for freehold title, and this solution was favoured by the Atkinson Government. He was appointed in March 1892 a member of the Executive Council representing the native race, and had to support the government in compulsory acquisition.

Te Kotahitanga Māori MPs crtitcised Carroll's stance, and he decided to stand for the General  Electorate of Waiapu. He won this seat in 1893, the first time a Māori was elected to a General Electorate seat.

Te Kotahitanga continued to promote a separate law-making assembly for Māori, and Carroll travelled to Māori communities speaking out against separatism. In 1899, he became Native Minister in the Liberal Government, the first person of Māori descent to hold this office. He established the Māori Councils Act, which allowed  local Māori committees to deal with health, sanitation and liquor control, and the Māori land councils, controlled by Māori and which could sell or lease land.

The settler view was that much of the North Island under Māori control should be developed, and Carroll as Native Minister to 1912 was under pressure to allow more land sales. Many Māori consider that he made too many concessions, but he always fought for the rights of Māori at a time when there was little support for his views.

Twice in the Liberal Government, Carroll acted as Prime Minister, and his status was confirmed by the awarding in 1911 of the KCMG, becoming the first Maori to be knighted. Carroll continued to represent the general electorate of Gisborne until 1919, when he was defeated by Douglas Lysnar.

On 2 September 1921, Carroll was appointed to the Legislative Council by Prime Minister William Massey. From the Upper House of New Zealand, he was able to support Āpirana Ngata and other rising Māori leaders.

He died suddenly in Auckland from kidney failure on 18 October 1926. His body was returned to Gisborne, where he was buried at Makaraka.

Farmer and politician Turi Carroll was a nephew.

Further reading

Notes

External links

References

|-

1857 births
1926 deaths
New Zealand Knights Commander of the Order of St Michael and St George
New Zealand MPs for Māori electorates
Members of the Cabinet of New Zealand
Members of the New Zealand Legislative Council
New Zealand farmers
New Zealand Liberal Party MPs
New Zealand people of Irish descent
Ngāti Kahungunu people
People from Wairoa
People of the New Zealand Wars
New Zealand Liberal Party MLCs
Māori MLCs
Deaths from kidney failure
Members of the New Zealand House of Representatives
New Zealand MPs for North Island electorates
Unsuccessful candidates in the 1884 New Zealand general election
Unsuccessful candidates in the 1919 New Zealand general election
Colonial Secretaries of New Zealand
19th-century New Zealand politicians
New Zealand politicians awarded knighthoods